The final of the Men's Long Jump event at the 2006 European Championships in Gothenburg, Sweden was held on Tuesday August 8, 2006. There were a total number of 28 participating athletes. The qualifying rounds were staged a day earlier, on Monday August 7, with the mark set in 7.95 metres.

Medalists

Schedule
All times are Central European Time (UTC+1)

Abbreviations
All results shown are in metres

Records

Qualification

Group A

Group B

Final

See also
 2006 Long Jump Year Ranking

References
 todor66
 Official results

Long jump
Long jump at the European Athletics Championships